Joachim Engel (born 1954) is a German scientist and a professor.  Since 2006 he has been professor of Mathematics and Mathematical Education at the Ludwigsburg University of Education, after two years as a Professor of Mathematical Education at Leibniz University Hannover (2004–2006).  Before becoming a professor he worked as a research fellow at the University of Heidelberg in applied mathematics and the University of Bonn in Economics and was a Visiting Assistant Professor at the University of Michigan in Ann Arbor.

Training 
Engel obtained a German Diploma in Mathematics in 1977 and teaching credentials as a high school teacher (Mathematics and Theology) at the University of Bonn. After his graduation he joined Eirene – International Christian Service for Peace and worked as volunteer with troubled teenagers in Ohio and with a community serving the homeless in Los Angeles. Back to academic life, he obtained a master's degree at the University of Southern California in 1986 and his PhD in applied mathematics in 1988. He then worked in the US and Germany as a research fellow and obtained his German Habilitation in mathematics education from Ludwigsburg University in 1998.

Academic contributions 
In his early work Joachim Engel specialized in nonparametric curve estimation and signal detection applying methods of harmonic analysis (Engel, 1994) (Engel & Kneip 1996) and kernel regression to biomedical growth curves and economics.  Recently he is best known for his contributions in Statistics Education,  investigating students’ comprehension of randomness and variability (Engel & Sedlmeier 2005) and  introducing computer intensive methods, based, for instance, on bootstrap procedures (Engel & Grübel, 2008).
His experience on didactical methods for explaining functions and their uses for modeling real world problems is reflected in his widely used highly successful textbook on applying functions for modeling based on data. He also wrote a well-known textbook on Complex Variables.

He has been an active member of the International Association for Statistical Education (IASE) and a coordinator of  ProCivicStat (www.procivicstat.org), a strategic Partnership sponsored under the Erasmus+ program of the EU, aimed and empowering people to understand statistics about society. Since September 2019 he is president of IASE.

Books

Articles

References 

1954 births
Living people
20th-century German mathematicians
University of Michigan people
21st-century German mathematicians
Academic staff of the Ludwigsburg University of Education